The Venus figurines from Zaraysk are two paleolithic sculptures of the female body. Both are made of mammoth ivory. The age of these Venus figurines is about 20.000 to 14 000 years BC; they stem from the Gravettian. Zaraysk is a Russian town located between Moscow and Ryazan. The statuettes were found in 2005 by Hizri Amirkhanov and Sergey Lev. Finds from Zaraysk show features of both the Avdeevo culture and the Kostenki culture. 

The location of the excavation is under the wall of the Zaraysk Kremlin. The sculptures are kept at the local museum. The so-called figurine No. 1 is 16,6 cm high, shows a female body without a face. Presumably, the woman is depicted pregnant. Figurine No. 2 is not finished and 7,4 cm high. Both figurines were found near each other and were covered with the scapula of a mammoth. Both were bedded in fine sand, near the head was placed red ochre.

See also 
 Venus figurines of Mal'ta
 Venus figurines of Gagarino
 Venus figurines of Avdeevo
 Venus figurines of Kostenki

Literature 
 Amirkhanov H., Lev S., 2008: New finds of art objects from the Upper Palaeolithic site of Zaraysk, Russia, Antiquity 82 (318), p. 862–870 
 Cook, Jill 2013: Ice Age Art: the Arrival of the Modern Mind, London: British Museum Press. (p. 85 f., picture)

References

External links 
 Venus  of Zaraysk / Зарайск Венера, part of the Kostenki-Willendorf culture at donsmaps.com
 Ica Age art: arrival of the modern mind – List of objects proposed for protection under Part 6 of the Tribunals, Courts and Enforcement Act 2007 (protection of cultural objects on loan) (PDF-Datei)


Prehistoric sites in Russia
Ivory works of art
Archaeological discoveries in Russia
Gravettian
Venus figurines